The Shasta sideband (Monadenia troglodytes) is a species of gastropod in the subfamily Monadeniinae.

This species is endemic to Northern California in the United States. It is very rare, known from only nine locations around Shasta Lake, California. It is threatened by a variety of activities, but none of its sites are protected. The USFWS recently determined that it may warrant protection under the Endangered Species Act due to threats to its habitat from the proposed raising of Shasta Dam.

References

Molluscs of the United States
Monadenia
Gastropods described in 1933
Taxonomy articles created by Polbot